Beacon Press is an American left-wing non-profit book publisher. Founded in 1854 by the American Unitarian Association, it is currently a department of the Unitarian Universalist Association. It is known for publishing authors such as James Baldwin, Mary Oliver, Martin Luther King Jr., and Viktor Frankl, as well as The Pentagon Papers.

History
The history of Beacon Press actually begins in 1825, the year the American Unitarian Association (AUA) was formed. This liberal religious movement had the enlightened notion to publish and distribute books and tracts that would spread the word of their beliefs not only about theology but also about society and justice.

The Early Years: 1854–1900

In the Press of the American Unitarian Association (as Beacon was called then) purchased and published works that were largely religious in nature and "conservative Unitarian" in viewpoint (far more progressive, nonetheless, than many other denominations). The authors were often Unitarian ministers—dead or alive, American or British, mostly Caucasian, and far more male than female. Many of the books were collections of sermons, lectures, and letters, balanced by volumes of devotion, hymns, and morally uplifting tales.

New Century, New Mission: 1900–1945

In the early 1900s Samuel Eliot broadened the mission of the press by publishing books dealing with ethical, sociological, philanthropic, and similar subjects, as well as those of a more strictly religious character. . . . Although books of marked theology and religious note continued to have a predominant place in Association publication, the wide interest in all subjects relating to social and moral betterment were included and the evergrowing topics of war and peace and arbitration, or national amity and racial brotherhood were represented

The Modern Era: 1945– 

In 1949, Beacon published American Freedom and Catholic Power, an anti-Catholic book written by socialist and secular humanist Paul Blanshard, who was the assistant editor for The Nation.  

Under director Gobin Stair (1962–75), new authors included James Baldwin, Kenneth Clark, André Gorz, Herbert Marcuse, Jürgen Habermas, Howard Zinn, Ben Bagdikian, Mary Daly, and Jean Baker Miller. Wendy Strothman became Beacon's director in 1983; she set up the organization's first advisory board, a group of scholars and publishing professionals who advised on book choices and direction.  She turned a budget deficit into a surplus. In 1995, her last year at Beacon, Strothman summarized the Press's mission: "We at Beacon publish the books we choose because they share a moral vision and a sense that greater understanding can influence the course of events. They are books we believe in." Strothman was replaced by Helene Atwan in 1995.

In 1971, it published the "Senator Gravel edition" of The Pentagon Papers for the first time in book form, when no other publisher was willing to risk publishing such controversial material. Robert West, then-president of the Unitarian Universalist Association, approved the decision to publish The Pentagon Papers, which West claims resulted in two-and-a-half years of harassment and intimidation by the Nixon administration.  In Gravel v. United States, the Supreme Court decided that the Constitution's "Speech or Debate Clause" protected Gravel and some acts of his aide, but not Beacon Press.

Beacon Press seeks to publish works that "affirm and promote" several principles:

Beacon Press is a member of the Association of University Presses.

Books and authors

Beacon Press publishes non-fiction, fiction, and poetry titles. Some of Beacon's best-known titles are listed below.

The King Legacy Series
In 2009, Beacon Press announced a new partnership with the Estate of Martin Luther King Jr. for a new publishing program, "The King Legacy." As part of the program, Beacon is printing new editions of previously published King titles and compiling Dr. King's writings, sermons, orations, lectures, and prayers into entirely new editions, including new introductions by leading scholars.

Beacon Broadside
Beacon Press launched its blog, Beacon Broadside, in late September 2007.

Awards
In 1992, Beacon won a New England Book Award for publishing. In 1993, Beacon was voted "Trade Publisher of the Year" by the Literary Market Place.

See also

 List of English-language book publishing companies
 List of university presses
 Skinner House Books, another book publisher of the UUA, specializing in books for Unitarian Universalists

References

Further reading
 Wilson, Susan. "Beacon's Modern Era: 1945–2003," Journal of Scholarly Publishing (2004) 35#4 pp. 200–209 online

External links
 Beacon Press's Home Page
Democracy Now! Special: "How the Pentagon Papers Came to Be Published by the Beacon Press: Mike Gravel, Daniel Ellsberg, and Robert West (audio/video and transcript)

Political book publishing companies
Book publishing companies based in Massachusetts
Publishing companies established in 1854
Companies based in Boston
Unitarian Universalist organizations
Beacon Hill, Boston
1854 establishments in Massachusetts